Christ Church is on Church Street, Adlington, Lancashire, England.  It is a redundant Anglican church, and is recorded in the National Heritage List for England as a designated Grade II listed building.

History

Christ Church was built in 1838–39, and designed by Edward Welch.  It was a Commissioners' Church, having received a grant towards its construction from the Church Building Commission.  The total cost of the church was £1,560 (equivalent to £ in ) towards which a grant of £400 was given.  When St Paul's Church was built on a different site in the town in 1884, Christ Church became its chapel of ease.  Christ Church was declared redundant on 1 November 1980, and on 7 April 1982 it was approved for use as an office or for shopping.  As of 2013, it is in use as a restaurant.

Architecture

The church is in Neo-Norman style.  It is built in ashlar stone with a slate roof.  The church consists of a six-bay nave and a short chancel under one roof.  At the west end is a two-stage tower.  In the bottom stage of the tower are angle pilaster buttresses and a round-headed west door.  The second stage contains two lancet windows on three of its sides, and above this is an octagonal drum.  There was originally a spire, but this has been removed.  Along the sides of the nave are pilaster buttresses and round-headed lancet windows.  The east window consists of five stepped lancets.  On the south side of the chancel is a priest's door.  The interior has been altered, but three panelled galleries have been retained.

See also

List of Commissioners' churches in Northeast and Northwest England
Listed buildings in Adlington, Lancashire

References

Church of England church buildings in Lancashire
Grade II listed churches in Lancashire
Romanesque Revival church buildings in England
Churches completed in 1839
Commissioners' church buildings
Former churches in Lancashire
Christ Church, Adlington
Adlington, Lancashire